The Flavobacterium-1 RNA motif is a conserved RNA structure that was discovered by bioinformatics.
Flavobacterium-1 motif RNAs are found in metagenomic samples from the environment, and only one example of this motif is present in a classified organism.  This organism is Flavobacterium sp. SCGC AAA160-P02, which belongs to the bacterial phylum Bacteroidota.

Flavobacterium-1 RNAs likely function in trans as small RNAs, and do not exhibit a clear association with any type of protein-coding gene.  Most genes nearby to Flavobacterium-1 RNAs fail to match known conserved protein domains, suggesting that they participate in a poorly studied biological process.

References

Non-coding RNA